Heilig recht  is a 1914 Dutch silent drama film directed by Louis H. Chrispijn.

Cast
Annie Bos	... 	Leida van Galen
Louis Bouwmeester	... 	Arie van Galen
Esther De Boer-van Rijk	... 	Koos
Louis Chrispijn Jr.	... 	Max de Nessel
Koba Kinsbergen	... 	Leida's jongere zus / Leida's younger sister
Lau Ezerma	
Mientje Kling	... 	Figurante / Extra
Jan van Dommelen		
Barend Barendse		
Louis H. Chrispijn		
Willem van der Veer		
Fred Homann

External links 
 

1914 films
Dutch silent feature films
Dutch black-and-white films
1914 drama films
Films directed by Louis H. Chrispijn
Dutch drama films
Silent drama films